Irfanullah Shah (born 5 May 1995) is a cricketer from Bannu, Pakistan. He made his Twenty20 debut on 26 August 2016 for Federally Administered Tribal Areas in the 2016–17 Cool & Cool Present Jazz National T20 Cup.

In January 2021, he was named in Khyber Pakhtunkhwa's squad for the 2020–21 Pakistan Cup. In October 2021, he was named in the Pakistan Shaheens squad for their tour of Sri Lanka.

References

External links
 

1995 births
Living people
Federally Administered Tribal Areas cricketers
Pakistani cricketers
People from Bannu District